Midlands4Cities is an AHRC Doctoral Training Partnership (DTP) between the universities of the four cities of Birmingham, Coventry, Leicester and Nottingham in the Midlands.

History 

The Midlands4Cities DTP (formerly Midlands3Cities) was set up in 2013 to provide funding and support for doctoral training across the East and West Midlands through a mixture of older and more newly established universities.

Universities 

The universities involved are:

Birmingham City University
Coventry University
De Montfort University
Nottingham Trent University
University of Birmingham
University of Leicester
University of Nottingham
University of Warwick

Collaborative partners 

Midlands4Cities also is working with a number of collaborative partners in the creative industry with a view to working on collaborative research.

British Film Institute
British Museum
Broadway Media Centre
Central Conservatory of Music (Beijing)
Cinema Museum
City Museum Services (Birmingham)
City Museum Services (Leicester)
City Museum Services (Nottingham)
Creative Hinkley
Creative Leicestershire
Derbyshire County Council
Leicestershire County Council
Leicester Curve
National Archives
National Army Museum
Nottingham Contemporary
Phoenix Square, Leicester

References 

2013 establishments in England
Birmingham City University
College and university associations and consortia in the United Kingdom
De Montfort University
Coventry University
Educational organisations based in England
Higher education in England
Nottingham Trent University
University of Birmingham
University of Leicester
University of Nottingham
University of Warwick